The following is a list of episodes of the Canadian documentary series, Land and Sea, broadcast in Newfoundland and Labrador on CBC Television outlet CBNT-DT.

NOTE: This guide is a work in progress and changes will be made when more accurate information becomes available.

Season 14 (1977-1978) (Incomplete)
 "The Last Run" (September 14, 1977)

Season 15 (1978-1979) (Incomplete)
 "The New Squid Salesman" (October 24, 1978)
 "Cape Shore Songs and Stories" (January 23, 1979)
 "The Clarenville Shipyard" (January 30, 1979)

Season 16 (1979-1980) (Incomplete)
 "Herb Pittman" (October 24, 1979)
 "The Mackerel Fishery" (January 9, 1980)
 "Port aux Choix" (April 9, 1980)

Season 17 (1980-1981) (Incomplete)
 "Martin Flynn" (January 6, 1981)
 "Them Days" (February 3, 1981)
 "Air Sea Rescues" (February 24, 1981)
 "Change Islands" (Part 1) (March 10, 1981)
 "Change Islands" (Part 2) (March 17, 1981)

Season 18 (1981-1982) (Incomplete)
 "Troubled Waters" (October 6, 1981)
 "A Trip to the Ice Fields" (March 9, 1982)
 "Off to Boston" (March 16, 1982)

Season 19 (1982-1983) (Incomplete)
 "Nordetor" (November 17, 1982)
 "Centreville and Fair Island" (March 9, 1983)
 "The Coates Family of Main Brook" (March 23, 1983)
 "Silviculture" (June 1, 1983)

Season 20 (1983-1984) (Incomplete)
 "Rennies River" (November 21, 1983)
 "Baskets of Grass" (December 19, 1983)
 "Talamh An Eisc: The Land of Fish" (January 2 and 9, 1984)
 "A Question of Quality" (February 20, 1984)

Season 21 (1984-1985) (Incomplete)
NOTE: Originally broadcast on Monday nights.
 "Our Forest: Life or Death" (October 15, 1984)
 "Mackerel: The Last Chance" (December 10, 1984)
 "A Job's Cove Christmas" (December 1984)
 "West Coast Dairy" (1984)

Season 22 (1985-1986) (Incomplete)
NOTE: Originally broadcast on Monday nights.
 "The Waiting Game" (November 11, 1985)
 "Scallops: A Last Resort" (December 9, 1985)
 "A Fortune Bay Christmas" (January 6, 1986)
 "Winter Fishery Revisited" (March 10, 1986)
 "Herring: A Revival" (April 21, 1986)

Season 23 (1986-1987) (Incomplete)
NOTE: Originally broadcast on Monday nights.
 "St. Pierre" (December 1, 1986)
 "Fishing Along the French Shore" (December 8, 1986)
 "Remembering This Land" (December 15, 1986)
 "A Fortune Bay Christmas" (Archival from Season 22) (December 29, 1986)
 "Peddling Fish the American Way" (February 16, 1987)

Season 24 (1987-1988) (Incomplete)
 "The Turkey Farmer" (December 21, 1987)

Season 25 (1988-1989) (Incomplete)
 "Trucking Industry" (January 16, 1989)
 "Managing Our Moose" (March 6, 1989)
 "Foley's New Boat" (May 15, 1989)

Season 26 (1989-1990) (Incomplete)
NOTE: Originally broadcast on Monday nights.
 "T&H Fishery of Cox's Cove" (December 4, 1989)
 "Gaultois: The Waiting Game" (January 8, 1990)
 "Twillingate Fishery" (January 15, 1990)
 "Newfoundland Silvers" (February 12, 1990)
 "Port aux Basques Winter Fishery" (February 19, 1990)
 "Fish Farming" (March 12, 1990)

Season 27 (1990-1991) (Incomplete)
 "Trouble at the Tip" (October 15, 1990)
 "Rencontre East" (November 5, 1990)
 "Soulie's Lost Mine" (November 26, 1990)

Season 29 (1992-1993) (Incomplete)
Last of the herd: Bison on Brunette Island

Season 30 (1994-1995) (Incomplete)
 "The Trouble with Beavers" (April 3, 1995)
 "The Plant Workers of Charleston" (May 1, 1995)
 "Last of the Lighthouse Keepers" (May 8, 1995)

Season 33 (1997-1998) (Incomplete)
NOTE: Originally broadcast on Monday nights.
 "Falabella Man" (November 3, 1997)
 "Back on the Water" (December 8, 1997)
 "Songs of the Irish Cape Shore" (January 5, 1998)
 "The Mushauau Innu" (January 12, 1998)
 "The Loss of the Myers III" (Archival from 1988) (January 19, 1998)
 "The Pig Farmer of Ferryland" (February 2, 1998)
 "Silver Fox Island" (February 9, 1998)
 "Becoming an Outdoors Woman" (February 16, 1998)
 "Red Cliff Times" (March 2, 1998)
 "In the Name of the Pine Marten" (March 9, 1998)
 "Pine Marten Country" (March 23, 1998)
 "Harry Martin's Labrador" (April 6, 1998)
 "Labrador Road" (April 13, 1998)
 "The Ashuanipi Reunion" (April 20, 1998)
 "The Labrador Seal Hunt" (April, 1998)

Season 34 (1998-1999) 
 "The Labrador Seamstress" (October 9, 1998)
 "Bog Farmers of Seal Cove" (October 23, 1998)
 "Boston Seafood" (November 6, 1998)
 "In the Name of the Pine Marten" (November 20, 1998)
 "Mountain Bikers" (December 11, 1998)
 "Once Upon a Christmas Time" (December 25, 1998)
 "The Woodswoman" (January 15, 1999)
 "Bringing Back the Lobsters" (January 29, 1999)
 "A Private Issue" (February 12, 1999)
 "Caribou Concerns" (April 23, 1999)
 "Flying with Falcons" (April 30, 1999)

Season 35 (1999-2000)
NOTE: Originally broadcast every second Friday night.
 "Land and Sea 25th Anniversary" [submaster] (Sept 19 1999)
 "The Land of Cod and Copper" (October 15, 1999)
 "Railway Walk" (October 29, 1999)
 "The Perfect Storm" (Part 1) (November 12, 1999)
 "The Perfect Storm" (Part 2) (November 26, 1999)
 "Once Upon a Christmas Time" (Archival from 1998) (December 10, 1999)
 "A Fortune Bay Christmas" (Archival from Season 22) (December 24, 1999)
 "Milking the Market" (January 7, 2000)
 "The Food Fishery" (January 21, 2000)
 "The Artist as a Fisherman" (February 4, 2000)
 "If Wishes Were Horses" (February 18, 2000)
 "A Labrador Homecoming" (March 3, 2000)
 "The Unforgettable Fisherman" (March 23, 2000)
 "The Alpacas of Port au Port" (April 7, 2000)
 "The Mattea" (April 21, 2000)
 "Adventure Kayaking" (May 5, 2000)

Season 36 (2000-2001)
NOTE: Originally broadcast every Tuesday night.
 "Sabrina of St. Carol's" (January 23, 2001)
 "A Picture of Exploits" (January 30, 2001)
 "Jacky's Giants" (February 6, 2001)
 "Cathi and Clayton" (February 13, 2001)
 "The Bonds of Earth" (Part 1) (February 20, 2001)
 "The Bonds of Earth" (Part 2) (February 27, 2001)
 "Rideout's Recipe for Homegrown Retirement" (March 6, 2001)
 "The Railway Ride" (March 13, 2001)
 "The Last of the Carbonear Stationers" (March 20, 2001)
 "Death of a Fisherman" (March 27, 2001)
 "Changing Course" (April 3, 2001)
 "Ray Lake, a Son of St. Lawrence" (April 10, 2001)
 "A Thousand Flights and More" (April 17, 2001)
 "From the Stump Up" (April 24, 2001)

Season 37 (2001-2002)
NOTE: Originally broadcast every Tuesday then Monday night.
 "The Wonderful Grand Hikers" (November 6, 2001)
 "An Ordinary Second" (November 13, 2001)
 "The Greenspond Letter" (November 20, 2001)
 "The Keeper of the Cape" (November 27, 2001)
 "The Bee Charmers" (December 4, 2001)
 "A Lifetime of Seasons" (February 25, 2002)
 "Seven Days" (March 4, 2002)
 "Quest for a Catamaran" (March 11, 2002)
 "The Rangers" (March 18, 2002)
 "O'Grady's Irish Pipes" (March 25, 2002)
 "The Hero" (April 1, 2002)
 "The Springdale Christmas Whales" (April 8, 2002)
 "Musical Memories" (April 15, 2002)

Season 38 (2002-2003)
NOTE: Originally broadcast on Wednesday nights.
 "The Southern Reflections" (October 23, 2002)
 "The Grand River" (October 30, 2002)
 "The Wreck of the Florizel" (November 6, 2002)
 "More Than Just a Pretty Place" (November 13, 2002)
 "The White Fleet" (November 20, 2002)
 "The Dust of His Ancestors" (January 15, 2003)
 "The Ocean Traveller" (January 22, 2003)
 "The Truth Lies in the Rocks" (January 29, 2003)
 "A Harvest of Seals" (February 5, 2003)
 "And Then There Was Light" (February 19, 2003)
 "A Portrait of Lights" (February 26, 2003)
 "The Gift" (March 5, 2003)
 "Resettlement: A Look Back" (March 12, 2003)
 "In Love with the Gander" (March 19, 2003)
 "Counting Coyotes" (April 2, 2003)
 "Fish Enough" (April 9, 2003)

Season 39 (2003-2004)
NOTE: Originally broadcast on Friday nights.
 "The Hugh Brothers" (October 24, 2003)
 "It's a Life" (October 31, 2003)
 "Their Story" (November 7, 2003)
 "A Dream Come True" (November 21, 2003)
 "Chatman's Bakery" (November 28, 2003)
 "A Fortune Bay Christmas" (Archival from Season 22) (December 5, 2003)
 "Twin Cities Seniors Most Excellent Adventure" (January 30, 2004)
 "A Rare Breed" (February 6, 2004)
 "Torn from the Sea" (Archival from 1971) (February 13, 2004)
 "A Story with a Hook" (February 20, 2004)
 "Why They Stayed" (February 27, 2004)
 "The Early Years" (Archival from the 1970s) (March 5, 2004)
 "The Peacemaker" (March 12, 2004)
 "Built with Pride" (March 19, 2004)
 "Seasons Remembered" (March 26, 2004)

Season 40 (2004-2005)
NOTE: Originally broadcast every Friday night.
 "Our Story" (October 15, 2004)
 "The Split Peas" (October 22, 2004)
 "The Grey Islands' Eiders" (October 29, 2004)
 "The Irish Loop" (November 5, 2004)
 "Sole Survivor" (Part 1) (November 12, 2004)
 "Sole Survivor" (Part 2) (November 19, 2004)
 "The Farmer's Daughters" (November 26, 2004)
 "The Parsons of Lethbridge" (Archival from 1981) (December 3, 2004)
 "Once Upon a Christmas Time" (Archival from 1998) (December 10, 2004)
 "A Fortune Bay Christmas" (Archival from Season 22) (December 17, 2004)
 "The Snowshoe Man" (January 28, 2005)
 "I Arose from the Woodlands" (February 4, 2005)
 "The People of the Torngats" (Archival from 1972) (February 11, 2005)
 "The Northern Nurse" (Part 1) (February 18, 2005)
 "The Northern Nurse" (Part 2) (February 25, 2005)
 "Salt Water Music" (March 4, 2005)
 "The Willing Lass" (Archival from 1985) (March 11, 2005)
 "From Wilderness to Wooddale" (March 18, 2005)

Season 41 (2005-2006)
NOTE: Originally broadcast on Monday nights.
 "The King of the Sheep" (November 21, 2005)
 "Paddy Miller's House" (November 28, 2005)
 "The Saltwater Boys" (December 5, 2005)
 "A Fortune Bay Christmas" (Archival from Season 22) (December 16, 2005)
 "Once Upon a Christmas Time" (Archival from 1998) (December 16, 2005)
 "Uncle Jim" (January 16, 2006)
 "Leaving Home" (January 30, 2006)
 "People Who Live by the Sea" (February 6, 2006)
 "Root Cellar Pride" (February 27, 2006)
 "Mining Memories" (March 6, 2006)
 "An Animal's Best Friend" (March 13, 2006)
 "The Valley of the Winds" (Archival from 1967) (March 20, 2006)
 "My Burgeo Home" (March 27, 2006)
 "The Fruits of His Labour" (April 3, 2006)

Season 42 (2006-2007)
NOTE: Originally broadcast on Monday nights.
 "A Few Tunes, Between Friends" (October 16, 2006)
 "A Family Affair" (October 23, 2006)
 "Boys and Their Toys" (October 30, 2006)
 "The Planters" (November 6, 2006)
 "Labrador Diary" (November 13, 2006) (Archival from 1988)
 "My Highway, the Sea" (November 20, 2006)
 "The Organ Master" (November 27, 2006)
 "A Fortune Bay Christmas" (Archival from Season 22) (December 4, 2006)
 "Wolf Dogs" (February 19, 2007)
 "Lawrence of the Lake" (February 26, 2007)
 "Music and Friends" (March 5, 2007)
 "The Daughter Who Did" (March 12, 2007)
 "Sunday Hunters" (March 26, 2007)
 "Torn from the Labrador Sea" (a continuation of Dave Quinton's "Labrador Diary") (April 2, 2007)
 "St. John's Harbour" (April 9, 2007)
 "The Cove of Love" (April 23, 2007) (Season Finale)

NOTE: "The Cove of Love" was to have aired on April 16 but an episode of Living Newfoundland and Labrador aired instead.

Season 43 (2007-2008)
NOTE: Originally broadcast on Monday nights.
 "The Traveling Pig Farmer" (October 15, 2007)
 "Tony the Tailor" (October 22, 2007)
 "Changing Change Islands" (October 29, 2007)
 "Change Islands" (Archival from March 1981) (November 5, 2007)
 "The Perfect Little Goat" (November 12, 2007)
 "The Mighty Churchill" (November 19, 2007)
 "The Tapestry of Conche" (November 26, 2007)
 "Any Mummers Allowed In?" (Archival from Season 22) (December 3, 2007)
 "Never Forgotten" (January 21, 2008)
 "If It Looks Good, Shoot It" (January 28, 2008)
 "From Fortune Bay to Lourdes" (February 4, 2008)
 "Coaker" (Archival from 1979) (February 11, 2008)
 "Zita of Fogo Island" (February 18, 2008)
 "Celie's Story" (February 25, 2008)
 "Caught Out in a Storm" (March 3, 2008)
 "Where Old Horses Go" (March 10, 2008)

Season 44 (2008-2009)
NOTE: These episode titles are subject to change at any time prior to broadcast. Also, unless noted, new episodes are now produced in 16:9 widescreen.
 "The Edge of the Ice" (October 20, 2008)
 "Ashes Island" (October 27, 2008)
 "When I Was in the San" (November 3, 2008)
 "The Horse Lady" (November 10, 2008)
 "The Land of Fish" (Part 2) (Archival from 1983–84; see below) (November 17, 2008)
 "All Around the Family" (November 24, 2008)
 "A Man Called Muck" (December 1, 2008)
 "Tracy Reid's Second Chance" (February 2, 2009)
 "A Lot of Good Memories" (February 9, 2009)
 "The Westport of Westports" (February 16, 2009)
 "Newtown, the Way it Used to Be" (Archival from the early 1980s) (February 23, 2009)
 "A Fisherman's Daughter" (March 2, 2009)
 "The Crest of the Wave" (March 9, 2009)
 "Dr. Jeon" (March 16, 2009)
 "The Trouble with Whales" (Archival from 1979) (March 23, 2009)
 "The Cormiers of the Valley" (March 30, 2009) (Season Finale)

NOTE: "The Land of Fish" was broadcast nationally on the CBC series This Land in 1983 and in Newfoundland in early 1984. The first half featured Otto Tucker, whose ancestral roots found him in England's West Country; the second half featured Aloysius (Aly) O'Brien and his Irish ancestral roots. Land and Sea aired Part 2 during this season. Part 1 aired during the following season.

Season 45 (2009-2010)
NOTE: Because of the expansion of CBC's hour-long local newscasts to 90 minutes, Land and Sea now airs separate feeds on Sunday afternoons at 12:00 pm (12:30 in Newfoundland). Episodes listed here will be Newfoundland and Labrador-based. Maritime-based episodes are not listed here. The new season started on October 18, 2009.

 "Wood or Nothing" (October 18, 2009)
 "Politics of the Pelt" (October 25, 2009)
 "Honouring Their Own" (November 1, 2009)
 "The Land of Fish" (Part 1) (Archival from 1983–84; see above) (November 8, 2009)
 "The Only Child" (November 22, 2009) (See below)
 "Racing Forwards" (November 29, 2009)
 "Gaby Gale" (December 6, 2009)
 "The Garden of Mancel" (January 31, 2010)
 "Pretty as a Pitcher" (February 7, 2010)
 "The Finest of Firs" (February 14, 2010)
 "What They'll Leave Behind" (February 21, 2010)
 "Baskets of Grass" (Archival from 1983) (February 28, 2010)
 "Shades of the Past" (March 7, 2010)
 "The Story of a Quarry" (March 14, 2010)
 "Fried Squirrels and Beaver Tails" (March 21, 2010)

Season 46 (2010-2011)
 The Time of Tunes (Oct 17, 2010)
 Island of Peace (Oct 24 2010)
 Land and Sea Remembered, part one  (Oct 31 2010)
 Land and Sea Remembered, part two  (Nov 7, 2010)
 The Nobles  (Nov 14, 2010)
 Mistaken Mystique (Nov 21, 2010)
 The Grenfell—an archival special (Nov 28, 2010)
 Gone on the Track  (Dec 5, 2010)
 The Mi'kmaq Way (Jan. 30 2011)
 True Blue  (Feb 6, 2011)
 The Squid Jiggin' Grounds—an Archival Special  (Feb 13, 2011)
 The Quahog Shuffle  (Feb 20, 2011)
 The Berry Belt  (Feb 27, 2011)
 The Fisheries Broadcast - an archival special  (Mar 6, 2011)
 Make It, Bake It or Grow It (Mar 13, 2011)
 The Heart of Hagan's Hospitality (March 20, 2011)

NOTE: "The Only Child" was supposed to air on November 15, with the subsequent episodes up to "Gaby Gale" intended to air a week before they actually did, but due to an error in Toronto, the dates were pushed back.

Season 47 (2011-2012)
 Dulcie's in the Store (Apr 15, 2012)
 Eco-Fishery (Apr 22, 2012)
 The Car Buffs of the Bay (Apr 29, 2012)
 Moose River Disaster (May 6, 2012)
 Resettlers Remember - the Fair Island Story (May 13, 2012)
 Sharks (May 20, 2012)
 The St. John's Farmers' Market (May 27, 2012)
 Schooners (Jun 3, 2012)
 The Igor Quilts (Jun 10, 2012)
 Cape Breton Fiddles (Jun 17, 2012)
 The Mummer Man (Jun 24, 2012)
 Young Farmers (Jul 1, 2012)
 Escape from the Cape (Jul 8, 2012)
 Sardines (Jul 15, 2012)
 Bill Kelly (Jul 22, 2012)
 Harness Racing (Jul 29, 2012)
 Southern Shore Sri Lankans (Aug 5, 2012)
 Rum Running (Aug 12, 2012)
 Feel Free to Sit (Aug 19, 2012)
 Pirates and Privateers (Aug 26, 2012)
 Rabinowitz Organic Farm (Sep 2, 2012)
 Last of Their Kind (Sep 9, 2012)
 What My Eyes Have Seen (Sep 16, 2012)
 Clara Oliver (Sep 23, 2012)
 Titanic - a Legacy of Safety (Sep 30, 2012)

Season 48 (2012-2013)
 The One and Only Celie (Apr 14, 2013)
 Saving Louisbourg (Apr 21, 2013)
 The Women Who Crossed an Ocean (Apr 28, 2013)
 The Mi'kmaq Journey (May 5, 2013)
 The Shepherd (May 12, 2013)
 Maritime Pickers (May 19, 2013)
 Lynda's Life (May 26, 2013)
 Sable Island (Jun 2, 2013)
 Chef Jeremy (Jun 9, 2013)
 Shipbuilding in the Maritimes (Jun 16, 2013)
 One Last Schooner (Jun 23, 2013)
 Saving Louisbourg (Jun 30, 2013)
 The Mummer Man (Jul 7, 2013)
 Tuna Fishery (Jul 14, 2013)
 Whale Rescue (Jul 21, 2013)
 The Sky's the Limit (Jul 28, 2013)
 Lobster Collapse (Aug 4, 2013)
 Patersons' Rural Resolve (Aug 11, 2013)
 Nova Scotia Islands (Aug 18, 2013)
 Frank and Mary (Aug 25, 2013)
 Maritime Forestry (Sep 1, 2013)
 Hunting the Hunter (Sep 8, 2013)
 Wild at Heart (Sep 15, 2013)
 Merasheen Magic (Sep 22, 2013)
 Wool Whisperers (Sep 29, 2013)
 Sea Junk (Oct 6, 2013)

Lists of Canadian television series episodes